Illinois Voices for Reform is a non-profit advocacy and support organization for Illinois sex offenders and their families. It is dedicated to providing education on issues affecting sex offenders to the public and to legislators. Illinois Voices for Reform is an affiliate organization of the National Association for Rational Sexual Offense Laws (NARSOL), and is one of the more than 50 organizations nationwide movement to reform sex offender laws in the United States. The group holds that current sex offender registry laws have gone far beyond their original intent of protecting children, and therefore aims to promote and supports laws that are sensible and make society safer while protecting the constitutional rights of everyone involved.

Advocacy
Illinois Voices for Reform aims to inform lawmakers and the public that sex offenders are a diverse group of individuals, and that contrary to popular belief, the recidivism rate of 5% over five years is the second lowest of all offender groups. The onerous restrictions and stigmatizing effect of public sex offender lists are unfair and unfounded when applied to all offenders indiscriminately, without considering the individual risk and underlying facts of individual cases.

Illinois Voices for Reform advocates for reforming state and federal laws that promote a "one-size-fits-all" policy, and for returning sex offender registries to their original purpose of monitoring violent sexual predators. Furthermore, they support reforming public registries and residency restrictions that have been proven to be ineffective at best, and, according to research, may be counter-productive, undermining rather than enhancing public safety. The group seeks to educate and correct inaccurate views held by lawmakers and the general populace about sex offenders, such as their alleged high risk of re-offending, which is the core rationale behind sex offender laws.

Illinois Voices for Reform says that current laws unfairly stigmatize young and low-risk offenders, such as those engaging in consensual teenage sex or sexting. They believe that laws should be based on research and empirical evidence of what works, and that "feel good" laws based on public hysteria surrounding high-profile, but rare cases waste taxpayer dollars, violate the rights of individuals, and can actually undermine public safety. The group has voiced its concern over laws that do not differentiate between violent and non-violent offenders to Illinois General Assembly. Accordingly, the group heavily objected to Illinois adopting the federal Adam Walsh Act. Recently, Illinois Voices for Justice has opposed a sex offender workplace registry bill that was introduced in the Illinois Senate in March 2015.

See also
Alliance for Constitutional Sex Offense Laws
USA FAIR, Inc.
Women Against Registry

References

External links
ilvoices.com
NARSOL
Registrants and Families Support Line

Sex offender registration
Non-profit organizations based in Illinois
Civil liberties advocacy groups in the United States